Craig Anthony Hodges (born June 27, 1960) is an American former professional basketball player and former head coach of the Westchester Knicks of the NBA Development League. He played in the NBA for 10 seasons and led the league in 3-point shooting percentage three times. He won two NBA championships with the Chicago Bulls, and along with Larry Bird, is one of only two players to win three consecutive Three Point Contests at the National Basketball Association All-Star Weekend, winning the competition in 1990, 1991, and 1992. Hodges also holds the Three Point Contest records for the most consecutive shots made with 19, set in 1991, and the most points scored in a single round at 25, set in 1986. He was later a head coach at Chicago State University, an assistant coach for the Los Angeles Lakers and head coach of the Halifax Rainmen of the National Basketball League of Canada.

Playing career
Born in Park Forest, Illinois, Hodges played college basketball at Long Beach State from 1978 to 1982. He played under Tex Winter, who later coached him again as an assistant to Phil Jackson with the Chicago Bulls.

During his career in the NBA, Hodges played for the San Diego Clippers, Milwaukee Bucks, Phoenix Suns, and Chicago Bulls. On December 12, 1985, Hodges led the Bucks in scoring with a career high 29 points, including a 27-foot three-point jump shot to force the game into overtime, in a 110–108 loss to the Washington Bullets. That postseason, Hodges played a key role in the Bucks advancing past the Philadelphia 76ers in the Eastern Conference Semifinals, averaging 14.1 points, 4.6 assists, and 3.3 steals per game during the seven game series, which included 24 points and the game-winning basket in game seven. The following round, in a pattern familiar for the 1980s Bucks, the team would ultimately fall short of reaching the NBA Finals, being eliminated by the Boston Celtics. Hodges then played for the Bulls from 1988 to 1992, and helped them win two NBA Championships in 1991 and 1992. He was waived by the Bulls after the 1991–92 season.

After sitting out the NBA season, he played a season with Clear Cantù in the Italian league.

Three Point Contest
Hodges appeared in the first eight NBA All-Star Three Point Contests from 1986 to 1993, and won the contest three times, in 1990, 1991, and 1992. He reached the final round on two other occasions, in 1986 when he lost to Larry Bird, and in 1989, when he lost to Dale Ellis.

Hodges holds the Three Point Contest records for the most consecutive shots made with 19 (1991) and is tied with Jason Kapono for most points scored in a single round at 25 (1986). He is tied with Hubert Davis for the highest score in the semifinal round at 24 (1991) and with six other players for the most bonus balls made with five (1989). Hodges has the second highest three-round combined score with 61 (1991).

Hodges competed in the Three Point Contest at the 1993 NBA All-Star Weekend as a free agent after he was waived by the Bulls in 1992 and did not sign with an NBA team for the 1992–93 season. The NBA initially left him off the field of contestants as he was not on an NBA roster at the time, but eventually allowed him to defend his 1992 title. Hodges wore a generic "NBA" jersey in the contest. Hodges was eliminated after the semifinal, finishing behind eventual winner Mark Price and Terry Porter.

Career Three Point Contest record
1986: Runner-up
1987: First round
1988: First round
1989: Runner-up
1990: Winner
1991: Winner
1992: Winner
1993: Semi-finalist

NBA career statistics

Regular season

|-
| align="left" | 1982–83
| align="left" | San Diego
| 76 || 48 || 26.6 || .452 || .222 || .723 || 1.6 || 3.6 || 1.1 || 0.1 || 9.9
|-
| align="left" | 1983–84
| align="left" | San Diego
| 76 || 28 || 20.7 || .450 || .217 || .750 || 1.1 || 1.5 || 0.8 || 0.0 || 7.8
|-
| align="left" | 1984–85
| align="left" | Milwaukee
| style="background:#cfecec;"| 82* || 63 || 30.4 || .490 || .348 || .815 || 2.3 || 4.3 || 1.2 || 0.0 || 10.6
|-
| align="left" | 1985–86
| align="left" | Milwaukee
| 66 || 66 || 26.3 || .500 || style="background:#cfecec;"| .451* || .872 || 1.8 || 3.5 || 1.1 || 0.0 || 10.8
|-
| align="left" | 1986–87
| align="left" | Milwaukee
| 78 || 43 || 27.5 || .462 || .373 || .891 || 1.8 || 3.1 || 1.0 || 0.1 || 10.8
|-
| align="left" | 1987–88
| align="left" | Milwaukee
| 43 || 0 || 22.9 || .449 || .466 || .821 || 1.1 || 2.5 || 0.7 || 0.0 || 9.2
|-
| align="left" | 1987–88
| align="left" | Phoenix
| 23 || 0 || 20.1 || .489 || .544 || .844 || 1.4 || 1.9 || 0.7 || 0.1 || 10.1
|-
| align="left" | 1988–89
| align="left" | Phoenix
| 10 || 0 || 9.2 || .444 || .333 || .750 || 0.5 || 0.8 || 0.2 || 0.0 || 3.9
|-
| align="left" | 1988–89
| align="left" | Chicago
| 49 || 6 || 22.7 || .475 || .423 || .849 || 1.7 || 2.8 || 0.8 || 0.1 || 10.0
|-
| align="left" | 1989–90
| align="left" | Chicago
| 63 || 0 || 16.7 || .438 || .481 || .909 || 0.8 || 1.7 || 0.5 || 0.0 || 6.5
|-
| style="text-align;background:#afe6ba;" | 1990–91†
| align="left" | Chicago
| 73 || 0 || 11.5 || .424 || .383 || .963 || 0.6 || 1.3 || 0.5 || 0.0 || 5.0
|-
| style="text-align;background:#afe6ba;" | 1991–92†
| align="left" | Chicago
| 56 || 2 || 9.9 || .384 || .375 || .941 || 0.4 || 1.0 || 0.3 || 0.0 || 4.3
|- class="sortbottom"
| style="text-align:center;" colspan="2"| Career
| 695 || 256 || 21.7 || .461 || .400 || .828 || 1.3 || 2.5 || 0.8 || 0.0 || 8.5
|}

Playoffs

|-
| align="left" | 1984–85
| align="left" | Milwaukee
| 8 || 8 || 27.0 || .364 || .174 || .800 || 1.6 || 3.3 || 1.5 || 0.1 || 8.0
|-
| align="left" | 1985–86
| align="left" | Milwaukee
| 14 || 14 || 32.9 || .510 || .452 || .794 || 1.8 || 4.5 || 2.3 || 0.1 || 13.5
|-
| align="left" | 1986–87
| align="left" | Milwaukee
| 12 || 0 || 18.8 || .519 || .294 || .909 || 1.8 || 1.7 || 0.8 || 0.2 || 7.9
|-
| align="left" | 1988–89
| align="left" | Chicago
| style="background:#cfecec;"| 17* || 17 || 32.6 || .412 || .398 || .714 || 1.5 || 3.6 || 1.3 || 0.2 || 11.2
|-
| align="left" | 1989–90
| align="left" | Chicago
| 16 || 1 || 15.9 || .378 || .293 || .750 || 1.1 || 1.1 || 0.3 || 0.0 || 4.4
|-
| style="text-align;background:#afe6ba;" | 1990–91†
| align="left" | Chicago
| 17 || 0 || 12.3 || .423 || .393 || .750 || 0.2 || 0.6 || 0.6 || 0.0 || 4.7
|-
| style="text-align;background:#afe6ba;" | 1991–92†
| align="left" | Chicago
| 17 || 0 || 8.1 || .390 || .450 || .500 || 0.2 || 0.3 || 0.3 || 0.0 || 2.5
|- class="sortbottom"
| style="text-align:center;" colspan="2"| Career
| 101 || 40 || 20.4 || .436 || .363 || .784 || 1.1 || 2.0 || 0.9 || 0.1 || 7.2
|}

Coaching career
From 1994 to 1996, Hodges coached college basketball at Chicago State University, and was fired in 1996 with a win–loss record of 8–51 over two-plus seasons.

In September 2005, Hodges joined the Los Angeles Lakers as a special assistant coach under his former Bulls coach, Phil Jackson. He worked with individual players on offensive skills, primarily shooting. Jackson retired after the 2010–11 season, and Hodges' contract with the Lakers expired as well. Hodges also coached the Halifax Rainmen in the Canadian Basketball League for half a season, and during his time as head coach of the Rainmen, was invited by Dennis Rodman to play in North Korea, but he was denied entry into that country, citing "I was looking forward to the opportunity of going and helping Dennis, as far as the basketball end of things", and saying "I'm for human rights, and so going to North Korea wasn't a matter of me going to rub political shoulders with the man that's in power. It was as a goodwill gesture, as a brotherhood — a brotherhood of sport,"

After serving as an assistant coach for the Westchester Knicks during the 2014–15 D-League season, he was named the team's interim coach for the final four games of the season on March 30, 2015 after head coach Kevin Whitted was fired.

Hodges is currently head coach of Rich East High School in his hometown of Park Forest, Illinois.

Political activism

When the Chicago Bulls visited the White House after winning the 1991 NBA Championship, Hodges dressed in a dashiki and delivered a hand-written letter addressed to then President George H. W. Bush, expressing his discontent at the administration's treatment of the poor and minorities. The book The Jordan Rules related how Hodges had opposed the 1991 Gulf War but mainly discussed his issues with teammates and coaches who mostly disagreed with him but didn't shun him for his contrary views.

Hodges also criticized his Bulls teammate Michael Jordan for not using his fame to draw attention to social and political issues, and said Jordan was "bailing out" for not being politically outspoken. In a 2022 podcast series on The Ringer hosted by Jackie MacMullan that covered "NBA Icons", MacMullan quoted Hodges as having asked Jordan to leave Nike and form a new athletic-wear company that would be staffed by minorities, and also that Hodges asked Jordan and Magic Johnson to lead a boycott of the 1991 NBA Finals to protest the beating of Rodney King by the LAPD. Jordan ignored the former call and bluntly told Hodges (along with Magic) that the boycott idea was a non-starter.

In 1996, Hodges filed a $40 million lawsuit against the NBA and its then 29 teams, claiming they blackballed him for his association with Louis Farrakhan and criticism of "African-American professional athletes who failed to use their considerable wealth and influence to assist the poor and disenfranchised." After he was waived by the Bulls in 1992, he did not receive an offer or a tryout from a single NBA team, even though he was only 32 years old and still able to contribute to contenders. The lawsuit claimed that Bulls assistant coach Jim Cleamons told him that the team was troubled by his criticism of players' lack of involvement in inner-city communities. The suit also claimed Billy McKinney, the director of player personnel for the Seattle SuperSonics initially showed interest in Hodges in 1992, and then shortly after backed away, telling Hodges he could do nothing because "brothers have families, if you know what I mean." While a Bulls official said Hodges was waived as he was getting old and could not play defense, head coach Phil Jackson said, "I also found it strange that not a single team called to inquire about him. Usually, I get at least one call about a player we've decided not to sign. And yes, he couldn't play much defense, but a lot of guys in the league can't, but not many can shoot from his range, either."

In 2014, Hodges was named to a team assembled by Dennis Rodman as part of his "basketball diplomacy" effort in North Korea with the job of playing an exhibition match against the North Korean Senior National Team to celebrate the birthday of Kim Jong-Un. He failed to make it into the country as his flight from Canada to Beijing was delayed, causing him to miss the connecting flight to Pyonyang and prompting the Chinese government to send him immediately back to Canada.

Hodges is the father of Jordan Hodges, an actor and artist, Jamaal, Noah and Jibril Hodges, who also played at  Long Beach State.

Hodges was married to Allison Jordan Hodges former General Manager of the ABL Chicago Condors and manager and sister to Drew Sidora.

Notes

References

External links
Craig Hodges statistics at Basketball-reference.com

1960 births
Living people
21st-century African-American people
African-American basketball coaches
African-American basketball players
American expatriate basketball people in Canada
American expatriate basketball people in Italy
American expatriate basketball people in Sweden
American expatriate basketball people in Turkey
American men's basketball players
Basketball coaches from Illinois
Basketball players from Chicago
Chicago Bulls players
Chicago State Cougars men's basketball coaches
College men's basketball head coaches in the United States
Galatasaray S.K. (men's basketball) players
Jämtland Basket players
Long Beach State Beach men's basketball players
Los Angeles Lakers assistant coaches
Milwaukee Bucks players
Pallacanestro Cantù players
People from Park Forest, Illinois
Phoenix Suns players
Rockford Lightning players
San Diego Clippers draft picks
San Diego Clippers players
Shooting guards
Sportspeople from Chicago
United States Basketball League players
20th-century African-American sportspeople